Jessica Foy (born 7 June 1995) is a Northern Irish footballer who plays as a forward and has appeared for the Northern Ireland women's national team.

Career
Foy has been capped for the Northern Ireland national team, appearing for the team during the 2019 FIFA Women's World Cup qualifying cycle.

References

External links
 
 
 

1995 births
Living people
Women's association footballers from Northern Ireland
Northern Ireland women's international footballers
Women's association football forwards